E3 ubiquitin-protein ligase RAD18 is an enzyme that in humans is encoded by the RAD18 gene.

Function 
The protein encoded by this gene is highly similar to S. cerevisiae DNA damage repair protein Rad18. Yeast Rad18 functions through  interaction with Rad6, which is a ubiquitin-conjugating enzyme required for post-replication repair of damaged DNA. Similar to its yeast counterpart, this protein is able to interact with the human homolog of yeast Rad6 protein through a conserved ring finger motif.  Mutation of this motif results in defective replication of UV-damaged DNA and hypersensitivity to multiple mutagens.

Animal models
Model organisms have been used in the study of RAD18 function. A conditional knockout mouse line, called Rad18tm1a(EUCOMM)Wtsi, was generated as part of the EUCOMM program — a high-throughput mutagenesis project to generate and distribute animal models of disease to interested scientists — at the Wellcome Trust Sanger Institute. Mice lacking Rad18 had no significant defects in viability or fertility, therefore  male and female animals underwent a standardized phenotypic screen to determine the effects of deletion.

Twenty five tests were carried out and four significant phenotypes were reported:

 Mutant male mice had a decreased body weight compared to wildtype control mice.
 Mutant male mice showed increased activity, VO2 and energy expenditure, determined by indirect calorimetry.
 Dual-energy X-ray absorptiometry (DEXA) showed mutant male mice had a decrease in fat mass.
 A micronucleus test found a potential increase in DNA damage in mutant mice.
A knockout in a human colorectal cancer cell line, HCT116, has also been created.

Interactions 

RAD18 has been shown to interact with HLTF, UBE2B and UBE2A.

References

Further reading 

 
 
 
 
 
 
 
 
 
 
 
 
 
 
 

Genes mutated in mice
DNA repair